Kibler Park is a suburb of Johannesburg, South Africa. It is located in Region F. Kibler Park has a nature reserve, 18 hole golf course, top class recreation centre, high profile conference centre and hotel, shopping centre's, 2 filling stations, 2 private schools, 1 government primary school, 1 government high school, pubs, churches and a fully operational fire station. It is a quiet farm type suburb at Southern edge of Johannesburg. Vehicle traffic is little except for normal peak hours. It is 15 minutes away from the Johannesburg CBD. Celebrity local Trevor Sturgess.

Neighbouring suburbs in the immediate vicinity are Risi Park, Patlyn, Mayfield Park and Alveda Park.

References

Johannesburg Region F